This is a list of cathedrals in the state of Illinois, United States:

See also
List of cathedrals in the United States

References

 Illinois
Cathedrals in Illinois
Illinois
Cathedrals